Gerard Zaragoza Mulet (born 20 February 1982) is a Spanish professional football manager.

Career
Born in Sant Jaume d'Enveja, Tarragona, Catalonia, Zaragoza played youth football for EF Dertusa, FC Cambrils and Gimnàstic de Tarragona as a youth, but retired due to an injury. He started his career at the Escola de Veterans de Cambrils, and subsequently went on to work at the Catalonia national team, taking over the under-14 and under-16s while also working as a scout for the Qatari branch of the Aspire Academy.

In 2010, Zaragoza moved to the Senegal branch of the Aspire, being manager of the under-16s. In 2011 he returned to his home country, being named in charge of RCD Espanyol's Cadete squad.

Zaragoza moved abroad in September 2012, initially in the backroom staff of Georgian Erovnuli Liga 2 side FC Locomotive Tbilisi. He subsequently took over as manager in November, and led the club to the second position of the East group, achieving promotion to the top tier. In May 2013, he took over FC Torpedo Kutaisi of the Erovnuli Liga, leaving the club the following January.

On 20 March 2014, Zaragoza returned to his home country and was appointed manager of CF Amposta in the Primera Catalana. In July, he was named Michael Laudrup's assistant at Lekhwiya SC, but returned to Locomotive in October 2015.

Zaragoza left the Georgian side in October 2016, and immediately rejoined Laudrup's staff, now at Al-Rayyan SC. For 2018–19, he acted as Carles Cuadrat's assistant coach at Indian Super League side Bengaluru FC, ending the season as champions.

In November 2019, Zaragoza returned to the United Arab Emirates after being appointed manager of Shabab Al-Ahli Dubai FC's under-21s. The following 8 March, he was named first team manager until the end of the campaign, after the sacking of Rodolfo Arruabarrena.

Zaragoza made his debut as manager of Shabab Al-Ahli on 13 March 2020, in a 5–2 away defeat of Ajman Club. At the end of the year Zaragoza left the club after a poor start of the season despite only losing once.

Managerial statistics

References

External links

1982 births
Living people
Sportspeople from Tarragona
Spanish football managers
FC Torpedo Kutaisi managers
FC Lokomotivi Tbilisi managers
Panserraikos F.C. managers
UAE Pro League managers
Spanish expatriate football managers
Spanish expatriate sportspeople in Georgia (country)
Spanish expatriate sportspeople in India
Spanish expatriate sportspeople in Qatar
Spanish expatriate sportspeople in the United States
Expatriate football managers in Georgia (country)
Expatriate football managers in India
Expatriate football managers in Qatar
Expatriate football managers in the United Arab Emirates
Expatriate football managers in Greece